Stagnicola is a genus of air-breathing freshwater snails, aquatic pulmonate gastropod mollusks in the family Lymnaeidae, the pond snails.

Species
The genus includes the following species:
 Stagnicola arctica (Lea, 1864)
 Stagnicola armaniacensis (Noulet, 1857)
 Stagnicola bonnevillensis Call, 1884
 † Stagnicola bouilleti (Michaud, 1855) 
 † Stagnicola bucciniformis (Sacco, 1886) 
 Stagnicola catascopium (Say, 1816)
 Stagnicola corvus (Gmelin, 1791)
  † Stagnicola forbesi (Gaudry & Fischer in Gaudry, 1867)
 Stagnicola fuscus (Pfeiffer, 1821)
 Stagnicola gloeeri (Vinarski, 2011)
 † Stagnicola jaccardi (Maillard, 1892) 
 † Stagnicola kreutzii (Łomnicki, 1886) 
 † Stagnicola laurillardiana (Noulet, 1854) 
 Stagnicola montanensis (Taylor, 1963) - Mountain marshsnail
 Stagnicola montenegrinus Glöer & Pešić, 2009
 Stagnicola palustris (O. F. Müller, 1774)
 Stagnicola pilsbryi (Hemphill, 1890) - considered extinct
 † Stagnicola praebouilleti Schlickum, 1970 
 † Stagnicola reinholdkunzi Harzhauser & Neubauer in Harzhauser et al., 2012 
 Stagnicola saridalensis Mozley, 1934
 † Stagnicola subpalustris (Thomä, 1845) 
 † Stagnicola syrtica (Peyrot, 1932) 
 Stagnicola traski (Tryon 1863) - widelip pondsnail
 Stagnicola turricula (Held, 1836)
 Stagnicola utahensis Call, 1884 - thickshell pondsnail
 Stagnicola ventricosella (B. Dybowski, 1913)
 Stagnicola zebrella (B. Dybowski, 1913)
Synonyms
 Stagnicola (Omphiscola) Rafinesque, 1819: synonym of Omphiscola Rafinesque, 1819
 † Stagnicola laurillardi (Noulet, 1854): synonym of † Stagnicola laurillardiana (Noulet, 1854) 
 † Stagnicola praebouiletti Schlickum, 1970: synonym of † Stagnicola praebouilleti Schlickum, 1970

See also 
 Catascopia occulta (Jackiewicz, 1959) - synonym: Stagnicola occultus (Jackiewicz, 1959)

References

 Huică, I.V. (1977). Studiul geologic al depozitelor miocene și pliocene dintre Valea Sohodol și Valea Blahnița, județul Gorj (depresiunea getică). Anuarul institutului de Geologie și Geofizică. 51, 5-68.

Lymnaeidae
Taxa named by John Gwyn Jeffreys
Taxonomy articles created by Polbot